Waterloo is an unincorporated community in southeastern Symmes Township, Lawrence County, Ohio, United States, along Symmes Creek.  It has a post office with the ZIP code 45688. Waterloo, Ohio is also noteworthy for having produced the Waterloo Wonders, who carried Ohio's Class B championship in basketball for both 1934 and 1935.

Notable person
Mary R. Grizzle, Florida legislator

References

Unincorporated communities in Lawrence County, Ohio
Unincorporated communities in Ohio